The Barren Grounds is a middle-grade children's book by David A. Robertson, published September 8, 2020 by Puffin Books. The publisher has named it a juxtaposition between traditional Indigenous stories and C.S. Lewis's The Chronicles of Narnia.

In the book, two Indigenous foster children, Morgan and Eli, find a portal in an unfinished attic bedroom that leads them into another reality, Askí. There, they meet friends and foes, and learn traditional Indigenous modes of survival.

Reception 
The Barren Grounds was a CBC Books number one bestseller for children's books for six nonconsecutive weeks, and remained on the list for over a year following publication.

The book received starred reviews from Kirkus Reviews, as well as positive reviews from Toronto Star, Toronto Public Library, CM Magazine,  and Publishers Weekly. NPR's Code Switch team named it one of five underappreciated books published in 2020.

Canadian Children's Book News, CBC Books, and Quill & Quire named The Barren Grounds one of the best books for young people in 2020.

Adaption 
On October 7, 2021, Robertson announced that ABC Signature had bought film rights to the Misewa Saga series.

References

See also 

2020 children's books
Children's fantasy novels
Indigenous literature